Arrowhead is a 1953 Western Technicolor film directed by Charles Marquis Warren, starring Charlton Heston, and featuring a supporting cast including Jack Palance, Katy Jurado, Brian Keith and Milburn Stone. The picture is based on the novel Adobe Walls by W. R. Burnett. The screenplay was also by Charles Marquis Warren.

Plot
Maverick scout Ed Bannon (Charlton Heston) is working with cavalry stationed at Fort Clark, Texas. The US army is trying to talk peace with the Apaches and move them to reservations in Florida. Bannon's activities seem counter productive to this new policy. Toriano (Jack Palance), the son of the Apache chief, returns from an Eastern education. Bannon is suspicious of his motives and their distrust of each other is eventually resolved by single combat.

Cast
 Charlton Heston as Ed Bannon  
 Jack Palance as Toriano
 Katy Jurado as Nita
 Brian Keith as Capt. Bill North
 Mary Sinclair as Lela Wilson
 Milburn Stone as Sandy MacKinnon
 Richard Shannon as Lt. Kirk
 Lewis Martin as Col. Weybright
 Frank DeKova as Chief Chattez
 Robert J. Wilke as Sgt. Stone
 Peter Coe as Spanish
 Kyle James as Jerry August
 John Pickard as John Gunther
 Pat Hogan as Jim Eagle
 Mike Ragan as Corporal Ives

References

External links
 
 
 
 
 
 

1953 films
1953 Western (genre) films
American Western (genre) films
Apache Wars films
Western (genre) cavalry films
Films based on works by W. R. Burnett
Films directed by Charles Marquis Warren
Films scored by Paul Sawtell
Films set in Texas
Films shot in Texas
Paramount Pictures films
1950s English-language films
1950s American films